Boris Markin is a Ukrainian sprint canoer who competed in the early 2000s. He won a bronze medal in the K-4 200 m event at the 2001 ICF Canoe Sprint World Championships in Poznań. Borys was born in 1979 and now he lives in the United States.

References

Living people
Ukrainian male canoeists
Year of birth missing (living people)
ICF Canoe Sprint World Championships medalists in kayak
21st-century Ukrainian people